Guy Janion Edwards  (11 May 1881 – 30 September 1962) was an English cricketer active in 1907 who played for Essex. He was born in Kensington and died in Upper Slaughter. He appeared in two first-class matches as a righthanded batsman who scored 45 runs with a highest score of 21.

He served in the Coldstream Guards in World War I and was awarded an MC in 1917.

Origins
He was a son of Arthur Edwards of Beech Hill Park, Waltham Abbey, Essex, by his wife Hilda Tennant, a daughter of Robert Tennant (1828-1900) of Chapel House in the parish of Conistone, Yorkshire, Member of Parliament for Leeds. His younger brother was the polo player Captain Arthur Noel Edwards (1883-1915).

Notes

1881 births
1962 deaths
British Army personnel of World War I
Coldstream Guards officers
English cricketers
Essex cricketers
Recipients of the Military Cross
Military personnel from London
People from Kensington